The 1960–61 Sussex County Football League season was the 36th in the history of the competition.

Division 1 remained at sixteen teams and Old Varndeanians was promoted from Division 2. Division 2 was increased to sixteen teams again, as LEC Sports joined, from which the winner would be promoted into Division 1.

Division One
The division featured 16 clubs, 15 which competed in the last season, along with one new club:
Old Varndeanians, promoted from last season's Division Two

Whitehawk & Manor Farm Old Boys changed name to Whitehawk.

League table

Division Two
The division featured 16 clubs, 14 which competed in the last season, along with two new clubs:
Southwick, relegated from last season's Division One
LEC Sports

League table

References

1960-61
9